Clark W. Tobin (January 1, 1887 – January 25, 1952) was an American college football player and coach.

Biography
Tobin played college football at Dartmouth College in 1909 and 1910. He was the captain of the 1909 Dartmouth football team and was selected as a first-team All-American at the guard position in 1909. Tobin also served as the head football coach at Tufts College in 1911.

Tobin was a native of South Boston. During World War I, he served as a captain in the infantry of the United States Army Reserve at Camp Meade. He later served as an executive vice president and sales manager for Propper-McCallum Hostery Company, Inc., in New York. Tobin died in 1952 at age 65.

References

1880s births
1952 deaths
All-American college football players
American football guards
Dartmouth Big Green football players
Tufts Jumbos football coaches
United States Army officers
United States Army personnel of World War I
Players of American football from Boston